Scopula puncticosta is a moth of the family Geometridae. It was described by Francis Walker in 1869. It is endemic to Colombia.

References

Moths described in 1869
puncticosta
Endemic fauna of Colombia
Moths of South America
Taxa named by Francis Walker (entomologist)